Anthony Joseph Furjanic (born February 26, 1964) is a former professional American football player who played linebacker for three seasons for the Buffalo Bills and Miami Dolphins of the National Football League (NFL).

References

1964 births
Living people
American football linebackers
Buffalo Bills players
Miami Dolphins players
Notre Dame Fighting Irish football players
Players of American football from Chicago